The 1997 AFL Draft was held at the conclusion of the 1997 Australian Football League (AFL) season. A Pre-season Draft and the second Rookie Draft were held prior to the 1998 season.

It is considered to have been one of the most successful drafts ever, with the top 11 selections each playing over 100 games of AFL football.  Other significant selections include Brownlow Medalists Simon Black at 31 and Adam Goodes at 43, as well as future Hawthorn captain Richie Vandenberg and Port Adelaide and Carlton star Nick Stevens. Black and Goodes played in seven Grand Finals between them from 2001 to 2012, Black winning three and Goodes winning two. Another notable player from this draft was Matthew Scarlett, who played a pivotal role in Geelong's 2007, 2009 and 2011 premierships.

The Melbourne Demons received the first two picks in the draft: one for finishing bottom of the ladder and a Priority Pick for winning just 4 games. Melbourne traded pick no.2 to Fremantle in exchange for Jeff White. Fremantle traded this pick to Richmond in exchange for Chris Bond.

In total, there were 86 picks to be drafted between the 16 competing teams.

1997 national draft

1998 pre-season draft

1998 rookie draft

References 

AFL Draft
Australian Football League draft
Sport in Adelaide
1990s in Adelaide